A list of films produced in France in 1992.

External links
 1992 in France
 French films of 1992 at the Internet Movie Database
French films of 1992 at Cinema-francais.fr

1992
Films
French